Liselotte Carola Gröner (31 May 1954 – 9 September 2019) was a German politician and from 1989 to 2009 was a Member of the European Parliament with the Social Democratic Party of Germany, part of the Socialist Group. She sat on the European Parliament's Committee on Culture and Education and its Committee on Women's Rights and Gender Equality.

She was a substitute for the Committee on Budgets, substitute for the Delegation for relations with the countries of South Asia and the South Asian Association for Regional Cooperation (SAARC).

Activities
 Vice-President of SIW (Socialist International Women)
 PSE coordinator on the Committee on Women's Rights and Equal opportunities
 Vice-Chair of the Children's Alliance
 Member of the board of the Association of Social-Democratic Women

Member of
 The  (AWO)
 Bund für Umwelt und Naturschutz Deutschland (BUND, Association for Nature and Environmental Protection)
 Europa-Union Deutschland
 Women's International League for Peace and Freedom IFFF

Main areas of work
 Spokeswoman for SPD Members of the European Parliament on youth policy

Rapporteur for
 The 1995 World Conference on Women in Beijing and Beijing +5
 Problems of children in the European Community
 Poverty among women in Europe
 Equal opportunities programme (interim report)
 2000-2006: The Youth Action Programme
 White Paper on youth

Personal life

Gröner was a lesbian and was married to Sabine Gillessen. The couple married in Belgium in September 2005, with Gröner announcing, "There is no discrimination of same-sex couples in Belgium by law. And this is the signal we want to give to the people in Europe, to send the message out: it's possible to honor the love of same-sex people by law".

See also
 2004 European Parliament election in Germany

References

External links
 
 
 

1954 births
2019 deaths
Bisexual politicians
Social Democratic Party of Germany MEPs
MEPs for Germany 1989–1994
MEPs for Germany 1994–1999
MEPs for Germany 1999–2004
MEPs for Germany 2004–2009
20th-century women MEPs for Germany
21st-century women MEPs for Germany
People from Neustadt (Aisch)-Bad Windsheim
LGBT MEPs for Germany